This is a list of Maine Black Bears football players in the NFL Draft.

Key

Selections

References

Maine

Maine Black Bears